Tales of Arcadia is a trilogy of computer-animated science fantasy television series created for Netflix by Guillermo del Toro and produced by DreamWorks Animation and Double Dare You. The series comprising the trilogy follows the inhabitants of the small suburban town of Arcadia Oaks, which is secretly home to various supernatural creatures and the young heroes who fight against the forces of evil that lurk in the shadows.

The three installments of the trilogy, Trollhunters, 3Below and Wizards, have been released worldwide.

Since its release, the franchise has been widely praised as an ambitious and boundary-pushing animated series, with Filmink's Travis Johnson calling it "the best children's animation to come along since Avatar: The Last Airbender."  Trollhunters was nominated for nine Daytime Emmy Awards in 2017, winning more than any other animated or live-action television program that year, and the trilogy has been twice nominated for the Emmy for Outstanding Children's Animated Series. It has also received or been nominated for a BAFTA Award, several Annie Awards, Golden Reel Awards, a Saturn Award, and twice won the Kidscreen Award of "Best New Series" for the first and final chapters, Trollhunters and Wizards. The franchise has been critically acclaimed for its high-quality CGI animation, its dark emotional and mature tone and complex writing, voice acting, representation of Latin Americans and immigrants, themes of prejudice, music, humor, and characters.

The show has also spawned several original children's books and has been adapted into a series of graphic novels by Marc Guggenheim and Richard Hamilton released by Dark Horse, and a video game titled Trollhunters: Defenders of Arcadia, released on PlayStation 4, Xbox One, Nintendo Switch and Microsoft Windows.

In August 2020, it was announced the trilogy would be concluded with a full-length feature film titled Trollhunters: Rise of the Titans, which was released to Netflix on July 21, 2021.

Production
Guillermo del Toro initially envisioned the idea of Trollhunters as a live-action television series. However, this was deemed impractical due to budgetary concerns of using computer generated monsters as main cast members in a live-action production, and as a result he instead turned the idea into a book he co-wrote alongside Daniel Kraus and published by Disney-Hyperion. DreamWorks Animation then optioned the book to develop as an animated feature film set to be directed by Pixar veteran Rodrigo Blaas, who stayed on as executive producer when Netflix greenlit the project as a CGI-animated television series. Marc Guggenheim was hired to pen the original screenplay for the film version, and went on to write pilot for Trollhunters. Dan and Kevin Hageman were brought on as co-executive producers for the series, with Aaron Waltke, AC Bradley, and Chad Quandt joining the writers' room.

Production on the series and its subsequent sequels began in early 2014 and continued until the end of the franchise in 2021. The project attracted an all-star cast, including the voices of Anton Yelchin, Emile Hirsch, Mark Hamill, Kelsey Grammer, Ron Perlman, Glenn Close, Lena Headey, Steven Yeun, Anjelica Huston, Diego Luna, Nick Offerman, Tatiana Maslany, Nick Frost, Stephanie Beatriz, Alfred Molina, David Bradley, Colin O'Donoghue, John Rhys-Davies, and more throughout its six year run.

In November 2017, del Toro announced that Trollhunters would be expanded into a trilogy of interconnected animated series under the name Tales of Arcadia. The two sequel series set to continue the story would be entitled 3Below and Wizards, and would explore the secret worlds of extraterrestrials and wizards hidden in the same fictional town of Trollhunters.

In April 2018, it was announced that despite the sudden passing of lead actor Anton Yelchin, the role of Jim Lake Jr. would incorporate both the voices of Yelchin and Emile Hirsch for the entirety of Part 3 of Trollhunters and future iterations of the series. Two characters introduced in the final season of Trollhunters—Aja and Krel (voiced by Tatiana Maslany and Diego Luna, respectively)—also reprised their roles and serve as the leads in 3Below. In May 2018, it was revealed that Steve Palchuk would also have his role extended into Wizards as well, making him and Toby Domzalski (voiced by Charlie Saxton) the first characters to encompass the entire trilogy. On July 7, 2020, it was revealed that the character of Douxie Casperan (voiced by Colin O'Donoghue) and his familiar Archie (voiced by Alfred Molina) would be introduced as the final main characters of Wizards: Tales of Arcadia, rounding out the ensemble cast.

In 2017, Marc Guggenheim and Rodrigo Blaas continued their role as showrunners and executive producers for 3Below, with A.C. Bradley serving as story editor and head writer until her departure to work on What If...?.

In 2018, Aaron Waltke and Chad Quandt returned as co-executive producers and co-showrunners with Marc Guggenheim for Wizards: Tales of Arcadia, before departing to write and produce the forthcoming television series, Star Trek: Prodigy.

Dan and Kevin Hageman and Marc Guggenheim wrote the screenplay for the finale film, Trollhunters: Rise of the Titans, released on July 21, 2021.

Synopsis

Setting
Tales of Arcadia follows the inhabitants of the small suburban town of Arcadia Oaks (a fictionalized version of Arcadia, California), which is secretly home to various supernatural creatures and the young heroes who fight against the forces of evil that lurk in the shadows.

Premise
In Trollhunters, a boy named James Lake Jr, becomes the first human to be a Trollhunter, carrying the duty of protecting both the trolls living in a secret realm known as Trollmarket and humans living in the surface world from an invasion of flesh-eating trolls known as Gumm-Gumms led by the vicious warlord, Gunmar the Skullcrusher.

In 3Below, two royal siblings named Princess Aja and Crown Prince Krel Tarron, who live on the alien planet Akiridion-5, must escape to Earth when their home is taken over by an evil general named Val Morando.

In Wizards, a sorcerer-in-training named Douxie Casperan must embark on a time-bending adventure to medieval Camelot in a battle with the Arcane Order to save the future of Arcadia Oaks and the world at large.

Finally, in Trollhunters: Rise of the Titans, all of the Guardians of Arcadia unite when the world is on the brink of an apocalyptic battle for the control of magic that will determine the fate of these supernatural worlds that have now converged as the Arcane Order reawakens the Titans.

Overview

Characters and cast members

Other media

Comics
Trollhunters: The Secret History of Trollkind (2018)
Trollhunters: The Felled (2018)

Novels
Trollhunters: The Adventure Begins (2017)
Trollhunters: Welcome to the Darklands (2017)
Trollhunters: The Book of Ga-Huel (2018)
Trollhunters: Age of the Amulet (2018)
Trollhunters: The Way of the Wizard (2018)
Trollhunters: Angor Reborn (2018)

Video game
Trollhunters: Defenders of Arcadia is a video game based on Trollhunters. It was released for PlayStation 4, Xbox One, Nintendo Switch and PC on September 25, 2020.

Accolades

Future
Following the release of Trollhunters: Rise of the Titans, writer Marc Guggenheim said the film is meant to "wrap up the trilogy and for this really to be the final chapter in the story", but that it simultaneously "also opens the door for a whole host of new storytelling possibilities", and that it was "designed to be a cap, and [he suspects] it will remain that way for at least a little bit".

References

External links

 
DreamWorks Animation franchises
Netflix children's programming
American children's animated science fantasy television series
Works by Guillermo del Toro
Arthurian legend
Television series by Universal Television